Sandrine Delerce (born 26 April 1975) is a French handball player.

She was born in Besançon, Doubs, France. She competed at the 2000 Summer Olympics, when the French team finished 6th, and at the 2004 Summer Olympics, when France finished 4th.

She was part of the French team that won gold medals at the 2003 World Women's Handball Championship.

References

External links

1975 births
Living people
Sportspeople from Besançon
French female handball players
Olympic handball players of France
Handball players at the 2000 Summer Olympics
Handball players at the 2004 Summer Olympics